Sakhyurta (from  - whitish) is a village in the Olkhonsky District of Irkutsk region of Russia, a part of the Shara-Togotskiy municipal unit. Located on the western shore of Lake Baikal, in 46 km northeast from the district center — village Elantsy and in 12 km southeast from the municipal unit centre — village Shara-Togot. Population: 

In the village the river station Malomorskaya (MRS) is located, which provides a ferry service to Olkhon Island. The ferry operates, as a rule, from May, 15 to December, 15. In the winter time the ice-road across Olkhon Gate strait is opened.

Gallery

References

Rural localities in Irkutsk Oblast
Populated places on Lake Baikal